Garder is a parish and village in Vestby municipality, Akershus county, Norway.

The name
The parish is named after the old farm Garder (Norse Garðar), since the first church was built there. The name is the plural of garðr 'fence; farm'.

Villages in Akershus
Vestby